Lady Guo (died 300), was a Chinese businesswoman and influential imperial favorite.

She was married to Wang Yan and the cousin of empress Jia Nanfeng, de facto regent of China. She was a favorite of her cousin the empress and became famous as a businesswoman when she used her position to accumulate a fortune through the beneficial contacts she acquired through her relationship with the empress.

References

3rd-century births
300 deaths
Year of birth unknown

3rd-century Chinese women
3rd-century Chinese people
Ancient businesswomen
Ancient businesspeople
Royal favourites